Peter Veness (10 April 1984 – 15 January 2012) was an Australian journalist. He worked in the Press Gallery at Parliament House for the Australian Associated Press.

Veness joined the AAP in 2006. He was diagnosed with a rare form of brain cancer in 2009 and died on 15 January 2012. His funeral was attended by Prime Minister Julia Gillard and several Senators.

References

1984 births
2012 deaths
Australian journalists
Deaths from brain tumor
Deaths from cancer in the Australian Capital Territory
Neurological disease deaths in the Australian Capital Territory